Franz Karl Praßl (born 28 September 1954 in Feldbach) is an Austrian theologian, church musician and composer.

External links 
 

20th-century Austrian Roman Catholic theologians
21st-century Austrian Roman Catholic theologians
People from Südoststeiermark District
Austrian composers
20th-century classical composers
21st-century classical composers
Classical composers of church music
1954 births
Living people